The Service régional d'admission du Montréal métropolitain (SRAM) is a network of Quebec CEGEPs, and handles their admissions process with a standardized application form.

Schools

Cégep de l'Abitibi-Témiscamingue
Collège Ahuntsic
Cégep André-Laurendeau
Collège de Bois-de-Boulogne
Champlain College Lennoxville
Cégep de Drummondville
Cégep Édouard-Montpetit
École nationale d'aérotechnique
Cégep Gérald-Godin
Cégep de Granby
Heritage College
John Abbott College
Cégep régional de Lanaudière à L'Assomption
Cégep régional de Lanaudière à Joliette
Cégep régional de Lanaudière à Terrebonne
Collège Lionel-Groulx
Collège de Maisonneuve
Cégep Marie-Victorin

Collège Montmorency
Cégep de l'Outaouais
Collège de Rosemont
Cégep de Saint-Hyacinthe
Cégep Saint-Jean-sur-Richelieu
Cégep de Saint-Jérôme
Cégep de Saint-Laurent
Collège Shawinigan
Cégep de Sherbrooke
Cégep de Sorel-Tracy
Cégep de Trois-Rivières
Collège de Valleyfield
Vanier College
Cégep du Vieux Montréal
Institut de technologie agroalimentaire, Campus de Saint-Hyacinthe
Institut de tourisme et d'hôtellerie du Québec
Macdonald College

Source:

References

External links
SRAM Website

Quebec CEGEP
Education in Montreal
Educational organizations based in Quebec